Dianne Fromholtz and Helen Gourlay were the defending champions.

Seeds

Draw

External links
 1977 Australian Open (December) – Women's draws and results at the International Tennis Federation

Women's Doubles
Australian Open (tennis) by year – Women's doubles